Michael D. Watson Jr. (born December 22, 1977) is an American politician and the incumbent Secretary of State of Mississippi. A Republican, he previously represented the 51st district in the Mississippi State Senate from 2008 to 2020.

Career
Watson is an attorney from Pascagoula, Mississippi. He ran in the 2007 Mississippi elections for the state senate against Tommy Robertson, and won. Watson considered running for governor of Mississippi in the 2015 Mississippi gubernatorial election, but opted to run for reelection instead.

While in the Mississippi Senate, Watson voted against legislation that would make it easier for college students in Mississippi to vote with absentee ballots; under the legislation, students would have been allowed to use college registrars as witnesses for their absentee ballot application.

In the 2019 Mississippi elections, Watson ran for Secretary of State of Mississippi. He defeated Sam Britton in the Republican primary, and defeated Johnny DuPree in the general election on November 5. He was sworn-in to the office on January 9, 2020.

In a television interview on March 26, 2021, Watson expressed concern that "woke" college students in Mississippi, among others, would vote, falsely claiming that an Executive Order by President Biden on March 6, 2021, would automatically register people to vote. Watson also falsely claimed that people would be sneakily registered without their knowledge.

After considering challenging Tate Reeves in the 2023 Mississippi gubernatorial election, Watson elected instead to run for reelection.

References

External links

1977 births
21st-century American lawyers
21st-century American politicians
Living people
Mississippi lawyers
Republican Party Mississippi state senators
People from Pascagoula, Mississippi
Secretaries of State of Mississippi
University of Mississippi alumni